is a Japanese composer and Guitarist from Chikusa-ku, Nagoya, Aichi Prefecture, Japan. From 1976 to 2021 he was the Guitarist and Leader of the Japanese Jazz-Fusion band T-Square. He was also one-third of Ottottrio, a supergroup led by three Japanese guitarists: himself, Hirokuni Korekata of KORENOS and Issei Noro of Casiopea.

Andoh was also commissioned to create the music for Arc the Lad: Twilight of the Spirits and Gran Turismo. He is one of the performers for the band's composition, "Truth", the theme tune for Fuji Television's Formula One World Championship coverage (which has been in use since 1987) and the F-1 Grand Prix video game series.

On February 1, 2021, Andoh announced that he would leave T-Square following the release of their next album and tour.

Discography

As a member of The Square/T-Square
Lucky Summer Lady (1978)
Midnight Lover (1978)
Make Me a Star (1979)
Rockoon (1980)
Magic (1981)
Temptation of Legs (1982)
The Water of the Rainbow (1983)
Both Temptation of Legs and The Water of the Rainbow were marketed under their native Japanese names.
Adventures (1984)
Stars and the Moon (1984)
RESORT (1985)
SPORTS (1986)
Truth (1987)
The song from which this album gets its name, "Truth", and its various remixes, such as "Truth 1991" (with Masato Honda instead of Takeshi Itoh), "Truth 21c" (2001, with Takeshi Itoh, as T-Square Plus), "Truth" (Drum and Bass Remix featuring Resonance-T, 2003), "Truth" (20th Anniversary Version, featuring Evolution-K, 2006), have been used as opening themes for Japan's F1 races from 1987 to 2006. It was not used from 2007 to 2011 before returning in 2012.
Yes, No (1988)
Wave (1989)
Natural (1990)
NEW-S (1991)
Refreshest (1991)
Impressive (1992)
Human (1993)
Summer Planet (1994)
Marketed under its Japanese name.
Welcome to the Rose Garden (1995)
B.C. A.D. (1996)
Blue in Red (1997)
Gravity (1998)
Sweet & Gentle (1999)
T-Square (2000)
Friendship (2000)
Brasil (2001)
This album featured a song named A Distancia, a song originally written by ex-T-Square Saxophonist Masato Honda, however, Takeshi Itoh played on this Track. Masato Honda released his own version on Cross Hearts, which was his Fifth Solo album.
Truth 21c (2001)
This album, as the name implies, includes an arrangement of the song "Truth" from the 1987 album of the same name. It also includes arrangements of other well-known T-Square songs.
New Road, Old Way (2002)
Spirits (2003)
T Comes Back (2003)
Groove Globe (2004)
Passion Flower (2005)
Blood Music (2006)
33 (2007)
Wonderful Days (2008)
Discoveries (2009)
Time Travel (2010)
Marketed under its Japanese name.
Treasured Songs – T-Square plays The Square (Original Title, たからのうた/Takara no Uta – T-Square plays The Square, 2010)*
This album became its own separate Series of Re-recordings of Vintage tracks from the era when T-Square was known as The Square (1978 to 1988).
Nine Stories (2011)
This album contains 9 tracks, 2 tracks written by each Current Official Member of T-Square, with 3 tracks written by drummer Satoshi Bandoh.)
Music Dream – T-Square plays The Square (Original Title, 夢曲 (ゆめのうた)/Yume Kyoku (Yume no Uta) – T-Square plays The Square, 2011)
This is the Second album in a series of albums in which T-Square would cover their songs which were originally released with the band known as The Square.
Wings (2012)
Smile (2013)
NEXT (2014)
Paradise (2015)
Treasure Hunter (2016)
REBIRTH (2017)
CITY COASTER (2018)
Horizon (2019)

As a member of Ottottrio
Super Guitar Session Hot Live! (1989)
Super Guitar Session Red Live! (1989)
Triptytch (1998)
T Comes Back (2003)1
T-Square 25th Anniversary (2003 DVD)2
Casiopea vs. The Square 1
1 denotes that, although Ottottrio has nothing to do with a Recording, Issei Noro played on it.
2 denotes that, although Ottottrio has nothing to do with a Recording, Hirokuni Korekata played on it.

As a Solo Artist
Melody Book (1986)
Melody-go-Round (1990)
Andy's (1996)
This album is the basis of Gran Turismo Original Game Soundtrack.
Includes the original version of Moon over the Castle.
Winter Songs (2011)
This collection of songs was possibly recorded within October 2010 to February 2011 and released in early March 2011. Also includes a cover of David Foster's Winter Games (Can't you feel it?).

As a video game composer
Arc the Lad (1995)
Arc the Lad II (1996)
Gran Turismo (1997)
Arc the Lad III (1999)
Gran Turismo 2 (1999)
Arc the Lad Collection (2002)
Arc the Lad: Twilight of the Spirits (2003)
Arc the Lad: End of Darkness (2004)
Gran Turismo 4 (2004)
Gran Turismo 5 Prologue (2007)
Gran Turismo 5 (2010)
Gran Turismo 7 (2022)

References

External links 
 

1954 births
20th-century Japanese guitarists
20th-century Japanese male musicians
20th-century jazz composers
21st-century Japanese guitarists
21st-century Japanese male musicians
21st-century jazz composers
Japanese composers
Japanese jazz composers
Japanese male composers
Japanese rock guitarists
Jazz fusion guitarists
Living people
Male jazz composers
Male jazz musicians
Musicians from Aichi Prefecture
People from Nagoya
Video game composers